Coogan's Bluff is a 1968 American crime thriller film directed and produced by Don Siegel. It stars Clint Eastwood, Susan Clark, Don Stroud, Tisha Sterling, Betty Field and Lee J. Cobb. The film marks the first of five collaborations between Siegel and Eastwood, which continued with Two Mules for Sister Sara (1970), The Beguiled (1971), Dirty Harry (1971) and Escape from Alcatraz (1979).

Eastwood plays the part of a veteran deputy sheriff from a rural county in Arizona who travels to New York City to extradite an apprehended fugitive named Jimmy Ringerman, played by Stroud, who is wanted for murder.

The name of the film itself is a reference to a New York City natural landmark, Coogan's Bluff, a promontory in upper Manhattan overlooking the site of the former long-time home of the New York Giants baseball club, the Polo Grounds, with a double-meaning derived from the name of the lead character.

Plot
Arizona deputy sheriff Walt Coogan is sent to New York City to extradite escaped killer James Ringerman. Detective Lieutenant McElroy informs him that Ringerman is recovering from an overdose of LSD, cannot be moved until the doctors release him, and that Coogan needs to get extradition papers from the New York State Supreme Court.

Coogan flirts with probation officer Julie Roth and takes her out for lunch. He goes to the prison hospital and bluffs his way to Ringerman, tricks the attendants into turning him over, and sets out to catch a plane for Arizona. Before he can get to the airport, Ringerman's girlfriend Linny and a tavern owner named Pushie ambush Coogan and enable Ringerman to escape. Detective McElroy is furious with Coogan and warns him against playing policeman in New York.

Coogan learns Linny's name from a visit to Ringerman's mother. While he is at Roth's apartment for a home cooked supper Coogan learns that Roth is Linny's probation officer and he finds Linny's address in Roth's home files while Roth is in the kitchen cooking them supper. He tracks Linny to a nightclub, where she offers to lead him to Ringerman. Instead she takes Coogan to a pool hall where he is attacked by Pushie and a dozen men in a bloody battle. Coogan holds his own for a while but is eventually overpowered. After hearing sirens the men take off, but not before the beaten Coogan kills Pushie and two others. Detective McElroy finds the bar in pieces and a cowboy hat on the floor.

Coogan finds Linny and threatens to kill her if she does not lead him to Ringerman. She takes him to Ringerman who is hiding out at the Cloisters. He is armed with a gun stolen from Coogan. Ringerman gets away on his motorcycle and Coogan commandeers a motorcycle of his own. Coogan gives chase through Fort Tryon Park and eventually captures Ringerman.

He hands the fugitive over to McElroy, who once again tells him to go to the DA's office and to let "the system handle this." Some time later Coogan, with Ringerman in cuffs, prepares to leave for the airport via helicopter from the helipad atop the Pan Am building. At the last minute Julie Roth runs up to the helicopter to give Coogan a long good-bye kiss. Coogan's last view is Julie Roth waving goodbye from the helipad as the helicopter lifts off.

Cast

Production
Before Hang 'Em High had been released, Eastwood had set to work on Coogan's Bluff, a project which saw him reunite with Universal Studios after an offer of $1 million, more than doubling his previous salary. Jennings Lang was responsible for the deal. Lang was a former agent of Don Siegel, a Universal contract director who was invited to direct Eastwood's second major American film. Eastwood was not familiar with Siegel's work but Lang arranged for them to meet at Clint's residence in Carmel. Eastwood had seen three of Siegel's earlier films, was impressed with his directing and the two became friends, forming a close partnership in the years that followed.

The idea for Coogan's Bluff originated in early 1967 as a TV series and the first draft was drawn up by Herman Miller and Jack Laird, screenwriters for Rawhide. It is about a character named Sheriff Walt Coogan, a lonely deputy sheriff working in New York City.

After Siegel and Eastwood had agreed to work together, Howard Rodman and three other writers were hired to devise a new script as the new team scouted for locations including New York City and the Mojave desert. However, Eastwood surprised the team one day by calling an abrupt meeting and professed to strongly dislike the script, which by now had gone through seven drafts, preferring Herman Miller's original concept. This experience would also shape Eastwood's distaste for redrafting scripts in his later career.

Eastwood and Siegel hired a new writer, Dean Riesner, who had written for Siegel in the Henry Fonda TV film Stranger on the Run. Eastwood did not communicate with the screenwriter until one day Riesner criticized a scene Eastwood had liked which involved Coogan having sex with Linny Raven in the hope that she would take him to her "boyfriend." According to Riesner, Eastwood's "face went white and gave me one of those Clint looks".

The two soon reconciled their differences and worked on a script in which Eastwood had considerable input. Don Stroud was cast as the psychopathic criminal Coogan is chasing, Lee J. Cobb as the disagreeable New York City Police Department lieutenant, Susan Clark as a probation officer who falls for Coogan and Tisha Sterling as the drug-using lover of Stroud's character. Filming began in November 1967 even before the full script had been finalized.

Reception
Coogan's Bluff was released in the United States in October 1968, where it grossed over $3.1 million. The film was controversial for its portrayal of violence, but it had launched a collaboration between Eastwood and Siegel that lasted more than ten years, and set the prototype for the macho hero that Eastwood would play in the Dirty Harry films. The script of the film inspired the McCloud television series that starred Dennis Weaver.

On Rotten Tomatoes, the film has an approval rating of 95% based on reviews from 19 critics.
Roger Ebert gave it 3 out of 4.
Vincent Canby of The New York Times gave it a negative review, and wrote: "The screenplay is so predictable in situation and so arch in its supposedly tough, blunt, wise talk that it turns into a joke told by someone with no sense of humor."
In 2006 Kim Newman of Empire magazine, gave the film 4 out of 5, calling it a "New York cop thriller with a touch of the Western and a touch of the Eastwood...and all the better for it."

Quentin Tarantino said the film "plays like a trial run for the next twenty years of action cinema. It's with Coogan's Bluff that Eastwood would establish his post Leone persona. A persona that would dominate action cinema for the next twenty-five years."

Home media
The DVD version of Coogan's Bluff is edited by approximately three minutes in all regions for unknown reasons. The missing scenes include Coogan receiving his assignment to return Ringerman from New York, a short scene in a hospital, and a scene in which Julie talks about Coogan's Bluff, a lookout point over the ocean near New York (the real Coogan's Bluff is a site on Manhattan Island between Washington Heights and Harlem), tying the location into the film's title. The earlier video release did not have these edits, and was released uncut.

See also
 List of American films of 1968
 New York Airways
 Pan Am Building

References

Bibliography

External links
 Clint Eastwood films
 
 
 
 
 

1968 films
1960s action thriller films
1960s chase films
1960s crime thriller films
American action thriller films
American crime thriller films
American chase films
American police detective films
Films directed by Don Siegel
Universal Pictures films
Fictional portrayals of the New York City Police Department
Films about the New York City Police Department
Films set in Manhattan
Films set in New York City
Films set in Arizona
Films shot in California
Films scored by Lalo Schifrin
1960s English-language films
1960s American films